Cándido Conde-Pumpido Tourón (born September 22, 1949) is a Spanish judge who currently serves as president of the Constitutional Court since January 12, 2023. 

Conde-Pumpido previously served as magistrate of the Supreme Court from 1995 to 2017, year in which he was proposed by the Spanish Senate as magistrate of the Constitutional Court. He also served as Attorney General of Spain from 2004 to 2011.

Personal life 
Conde-Pumpido was born in La Coruña, a city and municipality of Galicia, Spain. His father was also a Prosecutor. He graduated from the University of Santiago de Compostela and received his J.D. in Law and Economics in 1971. He worked as a Judge in San Sebastián and Segovia for twenty years. He played an active role on the boards of directors for the Judges for Democracy Association.

Conde-Pumpido was nominated to the Supreme Court of Spain in 1995. The Supreme Court of Spain is the highest court in Spain for all matters not pertaining to the Spanish Constitution. The court, which meets in the Convent of the Salesas Reales in Madrid, consists of a president and an indeterminate number of magistrates appointed to the five chambers of the court.

In 2004, Conde-Pumpido was appointed as Attorney General by the King of Spain, on a proposal from the Government of President Rodriguez Zapatero, after receiving the opinion of the General Council of the Judiciary, and he was the Spanish AG from 2004 to 2011. Now he came back to the Supreme Court of Spain.

He has written many papers, including "National prosecution authorities and criminal justice system: the challenges ahead". ERA Forum, NL, 2009.

Attorney general 

The Attorney General of the State (Fiscal General del Estado) is the highest official of the public prosecutor (Ministerio Fiscal) of the Kingdom of Spain. He was appointed by the King of Spain, on a proposal from the Government, after receiving the favorable opinion of the General Council of the Judiciary (CGPJ). He served as such from April 24, 2004 to December 17, 2011.

President of the European network of General Prosecutor near the Supreme courts 
Jean-Louis Nadal, Prosecutor General at the Court of cassation in Paris, strongly backed by Conde-Pumpido, created in 2009 the European Network of General Prosecutor near the Supreme Courts, which Nadal was the first president. In May 2009, Conde-Pumpido was elected, in Praga, as president of the network.

President of Ibero-American Association of Public Prosecutors 
In October 2007, in the XV Assembly held in Madrid, Conde-Pumpido was elected to assume the Presidency of the Ibero-American Association of Public Prosecutors (AIAMP).

Antiterror effort 

Conde-Pumpido reinforced the activity of the Prosecutor of the national hearing against Islamist terrorism as a response to the attack of March 11, 2004, in Madrid, increasing its workforce, creating a group of specialized prosecutors and fostering international cooperation to share information, getting the trial for the massacre should be held within a reasonable time and with damning of most of the defendants result. At the same time he advocated and put into practice a preventive criminal policy to Act police and judicially against the commands in training until they were able to cause damage, that improved police efficiency and produced a result positive to prevent further Islamist attacks in Spain throughout its mandate.

Conde-pumpido also launched a U.S.-Spain Bilateral Counter Terrorism Experts Working Group, with prosecutor-to-prosecutor dialogues on Counter Terrorism issues. The U.S.-Spain Bilateral CT experts Working Group was founded in March 2005 on the one-year anniversary of the Madrid train bombings. The January 12–13, 2010 meeting marked the first time that Organised Crime was on the agenda.

On April 17, 2009, Spain's attorney general, Candido Conde-Pumpido, said his office would not support Judge Baltasar Garzon's outrageous effort to prosecute Bush six Administration officials for their role in the US antiterror effort. Spain's AG said any such prosecution would turn his nation's National Court "into a plaything" for politics.

The European Public Prosecutor strongly backed by Conde-Pumpido 
Following the attacks on the eurozone by speculators in 2009–10, Spain proposed the EU enact the European Public Prosecutor provision so the post could co-ordinate legal action in retaliation. "Spain wants the European Union to use a planned public prosecutor's office for the region to protect the euro currency against speculators", Spanish Attorney general Cándido Conde-Pumpido said in March 2010.

Agreement to strengthen U.S.-Spanish cooperation 
On April 8, 2010, in Madrid, US Attorney General Eric Holder signed an Agreement to strengthen U.S.-Spanish Cooperation with Conde-Pumpido. Holder met with Prosecutor General Conde-Pumpido to discuss the many ways in which the United States and Spain can continue the excellent partnership we have established in counterterrorism, counternarcotics, money laundering, smuggling or combating international organized crime.

United States diplomatic cables leak 
On November 28, 2010, WikiLeaks and five major newspapers from Spain (El País), France (Le Monde), Germany (Der Spiegel), the United Kingdom (The Guardian), and the United States (The New York Times) started simultaneously to publish the first 220 of 251,287 leaked confidential.

According to the United States diplomatic cables released by WikiLeaks, U.S. officials tried to pressure Spain into dropping court investigations into the Central Intelligence Agency's extraordinary rendition, torture at Guantanamo Bay detention camp, and the 2003 killing of José Couso, a Spanish journalist, in Iraq by American troops. Politicians such as the former Deputy Prime Minister María Teresa Fernández de la Vega, the former Minister of Foreign Affairs Miguel Ángel Moratinos and the Attorney General Cándido Conde-Pumpido, among others, were pressured by U.S. officials.

The Attorney General Conde-Pumpido strongly denied the version of Ambassador Aguirre contained in the cables.

Magistrate of the Constitutional Court 
In 2017, the Senate proposed him as one of its candidates to assume a position within the Constitutional Court. He was appointed by the Monarch on March 15, 2017.

The initial proposal was made by the regional Assembly of Madrid, given that the Magistrates of the Constitutional Court appointed by the Senate are chosen from among those proposed by the parliaments of the Spanish regions.

He was elected president of the Court in January 2023. Before his election as president, he was considered the unofficial candidate of the so-called "progressive" sector of the Constitutional Court.

References 

People from A Coruña
1949 births
20th-century Spanish judges
21st-century Spanish judges
Prosecutors general of Spain
Living people
Attorneys general of Spain